Nacera Belaza is an Algerian dancer and conceptual choreographer who is known for performances that present repeated actions in an austere manner.

Biography
Belaza was born in Medea, Algeria and moved to France at the age of 5. As a child she did not attend dance classes, instead she danced in her own room. She studied French literature at University of Reims Champagne-Ardenne and then founded in 1989 her own dance company, the Nacera Belaza Company. Early in her career she was most often performing with her sister, Dalila. By the 2010s, she began including other dancers in her performances. She maintains her connection to Algeria,

Awards and honors 
Belaza earned the title of Chevalier de l'Ordre des Arts et des Lettres in 2015. Belaza was awarded the Syndicat de la Critique Prize for her piece Le Cri and the SACD Choreographic Prize in 2017. In 2021, she was named one of the 100 Women of Culture by the French association Femmes de Culture.

References

Further reading

External links 
 Official website

Living people
Female dancers
Women choreographers
University of Reims Champagne-Ardenne alumni
Year of birth missing (living people)